Monte Rocchetta is a 1,575 m mountain near Lake Garda, close to the city of Riva del Garda in the Trentino province of Italy.

Rocchetta
Rocchetta
Garda Mountains